Robert Richard "Bob" Timberg (June 16, 1940 – September 6, 2016) was an American journalist, writer, and author of four books, including The Nightingale's Song.

Timberg was raised in the New York City area.  His father was musician and composer Sammy Timberg. He received his college education at the United States Naval Academy and his journalism degree at Stanford University.  He served with the United States Marine Corps in South Vietnam from March 1966 to February 1967.  He worked for many years as a reporter for The Evening Sun and The Baltimore Sun.  He is also the author of John McCain: An American Odyssey  and State of Grace: A Memoir of Twilight Time, a book about his experiences with sandlot football and growing up.

Robert Timberg, who was disfigured by a land mine as a Marine in Vietnam, went on to become a successful journalist. His memoir Blue Eyed Boy charts his struggle to recover from his wounds. 

Timberg had four children: Scott, Craig, Amanda and Sam.

Author 
 
Alongside his successful career as a journalist and editor, Timberg authored four books.

The Nightingale's Song (1995) 
John McCain: An American Odyssey (1999) 
State of Grace: A Memoir of Twilight Time (2005) 
Blue-Eyed Boy: A Memoir (2014)

References

External links 

 Goodreads author profile

1940 births
2016 deaths
United States Marine Corps personnel of the Vietnam War
United States Marine Corps officers
United States Naval Academy alumni
American male journalists
Journalists from New York City
Stanford University alumni
American memoirists
American people of Austrian-Jewish descent
20th-century American non-fiction writers
21st-century American non-fiction writers
Writers from New York City
The Baltimore Sun people
21st-century American male writers
20th-century American male writers
Landmine victims